The 2011 Korean Tour was the first season of the Korean Tour to carry Official World Golf Ranking points. The season consisted of 17 events, five of which were co-sanctioned by other tours. All the tournament had prize funds of at least 300 million won (approximately US$300,000). Four had prize funds of 1 billion won (US$1 million) while the Ballantine's Championship has a prize fund of 2.2 million euros (approximately US$3.1 million). Total prize money for the tour was approximately 12 billion won (US$12 million).

Schedule
The following table lists official events during the 2011 season.

Order of Merit
The Order of Merit was based on prize money won during the season, calculated using a points-based system.

Notes

References

External links
English-language version of official Korea PGA site

2011 Korean Tour
2011 in golf
2011 in South Korean sport